Niguarda is a district (quartier) of Milan, Italy. It is an area located within Zone 9 of the city. It was an independent village until 1923, then became part of the city after the Giunta Mangiagalli (1917).

Monuments  
The Niguarda district in "Piazza Gran Paradiso" exposes the wonderful aquatic sculpture by the famous artist Dante Parini, the War Memorial "Monumento ai Caduti", bound by the Superintendency and the object of several sightseeing.

Districts of Milan
Former municipalities of Lombardy